"Let Me Be Your Valentine" is a song by German hard dance band Scooter, released on 29 February 1996 as the second single from their second album, Our Happy Hardcore (1996). Its accompanying music video was directed by Russell Curtis.

Track listings

Original version
 CD maxi
 "Let Me Be Your Valentine" (The Complete Work) – 5:42
 "Let Me Be Your Valentine" (Edit) – 3:47
 "Eternity" – 5:19
 "The Silence of T. 1210 MK II" – 1:31

Remixes
 CD maxi
 "Let Me Be Your Valentine" (Commander Tom Remix) (8:04)
 "Let Me Be Your Valentine" (Itty-Bitty-Boozy-Woozy's Blue Mega Blast) (6:23)
 "Let Me Be Your Valentine" (Simon & Shahin Remix) (5:21)

Charts

References

External links
 Scooter Official website

1996 singles
1996 songs
English-language German songs
Scooter (band) songs
Songs written by H.P. Baxxter
Songs written by Jens Thele
Songs written by Rick J. Jordan